Khayalethu Elvis "Khaya" Magaxa (born 29 January 1964) is a South African politician who is the Chairperson of the Portfolio Committee on Public Enterprises and a Member of the National Assembly of South Africa for the ruling African National Congress (ANC). He became an MP in May 2019. Magaxa was elected as a Member of the Western Cape Provincial Parliament in 2014, and served as the Leader of the Opposition from 2016 to 2019. He was the acting provincial chair of the ANC in the Western Cape from 2016 to 2019.

References

External links
Mr Khayalethu Elvis Magaxa – People's Assembly
Mr Khayalethu Elvis Magaxa – Parliament of South Africa

Living people
1964 births
Members of the National Assembly of South Africa
African National Congress politicians
Xhosa people
Politicians from the Western Cape
21st-century South African politicians